The Presidential Office Building is the work place of the president of the Republic of China on Taiwan. The building, located in the Zhongzheng District in the national capital — Taipei, was designed by architect Uheiji Nagano during the period of Japanese rule of Taiwan (1895–1945). The structure originally housed the Office of the Governor-General of Taiwan. Damaged in Allied bombing during World War II, the building was restored after the war by Chen Yi, the governor-general of Taiwan Province. It became the Presidential Office in 1950 after the government of the Republic of China lost control of mainland China and relocated the nation's capital to Taipei at the end of the Chinese Civil War. At present, this Baroque-style building is a symbol of the government and a famous historical landmark in downtown Taipei.

History 

At the time Japanese rule of Taiwan and the Pescadores began in 1895, the governor-general of Taiwan set up temporary headquarters at the former Qing dynasty secretariat. The new rulers began making long-term plans for development of the island. The plans soon included building a new headquarters for the governor-general. A two-stage architectural design contest was held in 1906 and 1910.

The architectural design of Uheiji Nagano was selected in 1910. Aspects of the design typical of Japanese architects in Taiwan's colonial period include a façade facing east and a creative blend of traditional European elements (Renaissance, Baroque and neoclassical). Plans were submitted to Tokyo where revisions were made to Nagano's original design. Tokyo authorities increased the height of the initial six-story central tower to 11 stories and made defensive improvements to the defense and corner towers. Construction began on 1 June 1912 and was completed on 31 March 1919 at a cost of 2.8 million Japanese yen. It became one of the best-known buildings in Taiwan during the period of Japanese rule after construction finished.

During the Second World War, the building suffered heavy bombing from the Allied Powers and was severely damaged. On 31 May 1945, during the Raid on Taihoku, bombs hit the front left side, main lobby, and northern sections of the Taiwan Governor-General's Office. The fire burned for three days, damaging large parts of the building. Forty-five days after the air raid, Japan surrendered.

The building was not repaired until 1947, when the Taiwan Provincial Government initiated a restoration plan funded through private donations. The restoration involved approximately 81,000 workers and was completed at the end of 1948, looking only slightly different from the original building. Since the timing of the restoration's completion coincided with the 60th birthday of President Chiang Kai-shek, it was renamed Chieh Shou Hall. ("Chieh Shou" means "Long live Chiang Kai-shek".) Beginning in mid-1949, the building served as the southeast military affairs office and, following the retreat of the ROC central government from mainland China to Taiwan, it became the Office of the President in 1950. In 2006 the name Chieh Shou Hall was dropped. The structure is officially referred to in English simply as the Presidential Office Building. It was previously known as the Presidential Palace.

Chronology
1895: The Qing dynasty cedes Taiwan to Japan in the Treaty of Shimonoseki. Japanese rule begins in the island.
1906: First stage of design competition for the Governor-General's Office.
1910: Final stage of design competition; Uheiji Nagano's design selected.
1912: Construction of the Governor-General's Office begins.
1915: Beam-raising ceremony.
1919: Completion.
1945: Heavily damaged by Allied forces on May 31. Japan surrenders its troops.
1947: Restoration by the Taiwan Provincial Government of the Republic of China begins.
1948: Restoration completed. Building named Chieh Shou Hall in honor of President Chiang Kai-shek.
1950: Building houses Office of the President after the ROC lost control of mainland China.
1987: President Chiang Ching-kuo signs decree ending martial law in reception room (July 15).
1990: Lee Teng-hui receives fifty Wild Lily student demonstrators and pledges democratic reforms (March 21).
1996: Lee Teng-hui inaugurated as the first popularly elected President of the Republic of China.
1998: Building declared a historic national monument by Ministry of the Interior.
2000: Chen Shui-bian is elected the first non-KMT President of the Republic of China since the end of martial law.
2006: Chen Shui-bian formally drops the name Chieh Shou Hall.
2008: Term of Chen Shui-bian expires; newly elected President Ma Ying-Jeou sworn in.
2014: A truck slammed into the main gate of the Presidential Office Building.
2015: A replica of the Presidential Office Building was seen during the People's Liberation Army routine exercise in Inner Mongolia.
2017: A man attacked the building guard with sword stolen from the Republic of China Armed Forces Museum.

Architecture 
The Presidential Office Building occupies the city block between Chongqing South Road and Bo'ai Road in downtown Taipei. It is designed in the shape of two squares stretching from Baoqing Road to Guiyang Street.

The 130 meter-wide facade faces east down multi-lane Ketagalan Boulevard. This reflects the concerns of its Japanese architects, who often oriented important structures toward the rising sun at the head of long avenues. (This feature may also be seen in Main Library of National Taiwan University.)

The building has ten entrances but only the front entrance and west gate are used for official functions. In the original design an ornate Baroque-style domed entrance hall greeted visiting dignitaries. This entrance hall was reconstructed with simpler interior features after destruction of the first hall in World War II. The west gate, the formal rear entrance of the building, features a grand marble staircase and porch lined with Ionic and Corinthian pillars.

The two-part main building, six stories high, mainly houses government offices and maintenance services. The office wings feature balconies and long corridor that allow view of the sunlit North and South Gardens.

The 60-meter tower at the center of the building was the tallest structure in the Taipei Basin during Japanese rule. When the Nationalist regime took power, a platform was built at the top floor to enable martial flag-raising ceremonies.

The Presidential Office Building stands within walking distance of the Judicial Yuan Building, 228 Memorial Park, the National Taiwan Museum, the original hospital of the National Taiwan University, the original East Gate of the City of Taipei, the Chang Yung Fa Foundation Building (formerly Kuomintang Party Headquarters) and the National Theater and Concert Hall at Chiang Kai-shek Memorial Hall. A few blocks to the west is Taipei's popular Ximending shopping district with its historic cinema and Zhongshan Hall. A few blocks to the north is Taipei Main Station and Shin Kong Life Tower.

Access
The building is accessible within walking distance South West from NTU Hospital Station of the Taipei Metro.

Former President Chen Shui-bian revealed that the grounds of the Shilin Official Residence contain the entrance to a hidden tunnel that connects to the Presidential Office Building.

Gallery

See also
 Presidential and Vice-Presidential Artifacts Museum
 History of the Republic of China
 President of the Republic of China
 Governor-General of Taiwan
 Japanese General Government Building, Seoul
 Presidential Palace (Nanjing)

References

Further reading
Shiue-chyn. "Architecture of the Presidential Office Building." Official Site: "A Tour of the Office of the President." Official Site: President of the Republic of China. Retrieved 2007-09-08.

External links

 Office of the President 
 Government Information Office
 Taiwan e-Government 
 Presidential Office Building at the Bureau of Cultural Heritage website 

1950 establishments in Taiwan
Baroque architecture in Taipei
Buildings and structures in Taipei
Presidency of the Republic of China
Government buildings in Taiwan
Government buildings completed in 1919
National monuments of Taiwan
Office buildings in Taipei
Office buildings completed in 1919